Cecil O. Hankins (January 6, 1922 – June 3, 2002) was an American professional basketball and football player who played for the St. Louis Bombers and Boston Celtics in the Basketball Association of America prior to the formation of the NBA.

Hankins was a four-sport star at Zaneis Consolidated School and attended Oklahoma A&M (now Oklahoma State University).  After playing basketball and running track as a freshman, Hankins transferred to Southeastern Oklahoma State University where he starred in basketball and football before returning to Oklahoma State for his senior year.  In that year, Hankins was a key player for Henry Iba's 1945 national championship team, averaging 13.3 points for the Aggies.  Hankins also starred on the gridiron, starting at halfback for the 1945 Cotton Bowl champions.

Following the close of his collegiate career, Cecil Hankins weighed opportunities in both professional football (with the Boston Yanks) and basketball.  He ultimately chose basketball, signing with the St. Louis Bombers of the BAA.  Hankins played two seasons in the league, with the Bombers and the Boston Celtics.  He averaged 4.9 points per game in 80 contests.

After his professional career ended, Hankins became a basketball and football coach at Sand Springs High School.  He also officiated basketball and football games at the collegiate level.  He retired as director of athletics at Sand Springs in 1988.  Cecil Hankins died on June 3, 2002.

BAA career statistics

Regular season

Playoffs

References

External links

1922 births
2002 deaths
American men's basketball players
Basketball players from Oklahoma
Boston Celtics players
Guards (basketball)
High school basketball coaches in Oklahoma
Oklahoma State Cowboys basketball players
Oklahoma State Cowboys football players
People from Sand Springs, Oklahoma
Southeastern Oklahoma State Savage Storm football players
Southeastern Oklahoma State Savage Storm men's basketball players
St. Louis Bombers (NBA) players